On August 18, 2021, the bodies of married couple Kylen Schulte (September 5, 1996 – c. August 13, 2021) and Crystal Turner (December 30, 1982 – c. August 13, 2021) were found in Moab, Utah, United States. Both victims were killed by gunshot wounds and had last been seen alive five days earlier. In December 2022, the case was closed and Adam Pinkusiewicz was cited as the murderer

Background 
The women were married on April 20, 2021, and often camped with their pet rabbit Ruth.
Two days before they were reported missing, Brian Laundrie and Gabby Petito were stopped by officers of the Moab City Police Department. This fueled speculation of a connection between the cases.

Killings 
Schulte and Turner were last seen the night of August 13, 2021, at a bar in Moab around 9:30 pm. The women were described as being deeply in love, with focus and attention majorly on each other. Witnesses said that no one had followed them out of the bar. After the couple had been out of contact for three days, a local friend received a phone call from Schulte's father, who lives in Montana. The father reported that the couple had moved their campsite, due to a "creeper dude" of whom they were scared. The friend went looking for the couple's campsite in the La Sal Mountains near Moab on August 18, 2021 and was on the phone with Schulte's father when she discovered Schulte's remains.

The friend later told reporters that she feared for her safety after discovering Schulte's remains. She called the police and did not continue to search for Turner. Turner's remains were also discovered, right near Schulte's remains. Both women were discovered undressed from the waist down in a creek close to the campsite, with multiple gunshot wounds on their backs, sides, and/or chests.

Investigation 
Responding police found a Kia Sorento, a camping tent, long-term camping tools and supplies, and a makeshift rabbit shelter when they arrived at the scene. They obtained a search warrant for another vehicle; a 1987 Ford Econoline that had been left in the parking lot and later towed. Inside the Ford, they found personal documents and a Bible. 

In October 2021, authorities released an affidavit for a search warrant that had been signed in September 2021 and executed within twenty-four hours. It included an investigation into a cell tower at Jimmy Keen Flats, near the campsite between August 13 and 15, only for phones within a  radius of the crime scene.

An anonymous local business contractor and a local private lending company have both offered separate $10,000 rewards for any information about the case as of November 2021.

In January 2022, the police announced they had identified a person of interest in the case, but he was cleared the following month.

In March 2022, a private investigator who volunteered to help Schulte's father claimed that law enforcement had obtained an audio recording from near the crime scene, on which gunshots and screams can be heard. Authorities admitted to the audio's existence, and confirmed that shots can be heard on it, but did not confirm that "screams" are heard. The private investigator also alleged that the audio was recorded at 11:35 a.m. on August 14, 2021, the morning after Turner and Schulte were last seen alive. Police confirmed the date, but would not reveal the time of day.

In May 2022, police confirmed there was a likely suspect in the killings named Adam Pinkusiewicz. However, he was reported to have left the state and killed himself after the killings. Pinkusiewicz reportedly confessed to another person and provided details that had not been made public. The motive for the murders remains unknown. According to Schulte's father, the police also found evidence at the crime scene pointing to Pinkusiewicz.

Reactions 
The first news release by the Grand County Sheriff's Office, issued on August 19, 2021, claimed that there was "no current danger to the public". This claim was met with skepticism by friends of the couple who believe the statement was to protect the tourism industry while investigating the case. There was also speculation that suspected murderer Brian Laundrie might be connected to the murders. On August 12—the day before Schulte and Turner were last seen alive—Laundrie was confronted by police for allegedly slapping Gabby Petito in front of the Moonflower Community Cooperative in Moab, where Kylen Schulte worked as a cashier. Law enforcement ruled out any connection between the two cases.

Schulte's family started a fundraiser to help cover funeral costs for her and have directed others to a separate fundraiser for Turner after the fundraiser reached its goal.

See also
List of solved missing person cases

References 

2020s missing person cases
2021 in LGBT history
2021 in Utah
2021 murders in the United States
August 2021 events in the United States
Deaths by firearm in Utah
Deaths by person in Utah
Female murder victims
Formerly missing people
History of women in Utah
Incidents of violence against women
Lesbian history in the United States
LGBT in Utah
Married couples
Missing person cases in Utah
Moab, Utah
Murder in Utah
Same-sex couples
Violence against women in the United States